The 1924 Klass I season was the second season of the Klass I, the top level of ice hockey in Sweden. The league championship was won by Djurgårdens IF.

Final standings

External links
1923-24 season

1
Swedish
Klass I seasons